The 2021 Minnesota United FC season is the club's fifth in Major League Soccer. Their season began on April 16, 2021 where they lost to the Seattle Sounders FC 4-0 in Seattle. The club will play its home matches at Allianz Field in Saint Paul, Minnesota. The club will attempt to reach the MLS Cup Playoffs for a third consecutive year.

Competitions

Preseason

MLS regular season

Standings

Overall

Western Conference

Results summary

Regular season

MLS Cup Playoffs

U.S. Open Cup

Statistics

Appearances and goals
Last updated 26 September 2021.

|-
! colspan="14" style="background:#585958; color:#FFFF; text-align:center"|Goalkeepers

|-
! colspan="14" style="background:#585958; color:#FFFFFF; text-align:center"|Defenders

|-
! colspan="14" style="background:#585958; color:#FFFFFF; text-align:center"|Midfielders

|-
! colspan="14" style="background:#585958; color:#FFFFFF; text-align:center"|Forwards

|-
|}

Assists and shutouts
Stats from MLS regular season, MLS playoffs, CONCACAF Champions league, and U.S. Open Cup are all included.
First tie-breaker for assists and shutouts is minutes played.

Club

Roster

References 

Minnesota United FC seasons
Minnesota United
Minnesota
Minnesota